Gary K. Michelson (born January 14, 1949) is an American orthopedic surgeon, medical inventor, and billionaire philanthropist.

Early life and education
Michelson and his three brothers were raised in Philadelphia by his mother and grandmother, whose struggles with syringomyelia inspired his interest in spinal ailments. After graduating Central High School of Philadelphia in 1966, he attended Temple University and Hahnemann Medical College of Drexel University, until finishing his medical residency in orthopedic surgery at Hahnemann Medical Hospital in 1979. Michelson then completed his fellowship training in spinal surgery at St. Luke's Medical Center, in a joint program between Baylor University and the University of Texas. He was a practicing spinal surgeon for over 25 years before retiring from private practice to focus on philanthropy.

He is of Jewish heritage.

Medical innovations & related legal battles
Seeing the low success rates associated with spinal surgery procedures early in his career, Michelson developed new implants, instruments and procedures for spinal surgery. These technologies, often recognized in the medical profession as "Michelson Devices", assist in surgical procedures by decreasing blood loss, incision size, and addressing other critical factors. Michelson is the sole credited inventor on over 950 issued or pending patents worldwide related to the treatment of spinal disorders.

In 2005, Michelson sold many of his spine-related patents to Medtronic for $1.35 billion, placing him on the Forbes 400 list. A legal battle with Medtronic over the origins of the patents preceded the sale. In 2004, Michelson cross-filed in response to Medtronic's 2001 suit, and was awarded financial damages for both lawsuits by the jury. The legal defense against Medtronic's suit established a major legal precedent in 2004, governing who bears the cost of pre-trial discovery of electronic evidence.

Philanthropy

The Gary Karlin Michelson, M.D. Charitable Foundation, Inc. was founded in 1995 through a $100 million contribution from Dr. Michelson (it was later renamed the Michelson Medical Research Foundation in 2005). The nonprofit does not accept donations.

Michelson Center for Public Policy
The Michelson Center for Public Policy endorsed a 2021 bill from Florida senator Vern Buchanan to end an FDA requirement that animal testing be used to determine a drug's efficacy on humans.

Michelson Found Animals Foundation
In 2005, Michelson launched the Found Animals Foundation, a 501(c)(3) private operating foundation dedicated to animal welfare. In response to Hurricane Katrina, the foundation created the Found Animals Registry, the first free national pet microchipping registry. Found Animals also performs surveys of pet owners, to study industry trends and owner/pet relationships.

In 2008, the foundation launched the Michelson Prize and Grants in Reproductive Biology in 2008, an international competition aimed at reducing shelter euthanasia by controlling pet overpopulation, as well as providing funding for non-surgical sterilant research.  In 2020, the foundation launched the Better Neighbor Project to support low income and homeless pet owners with food and veterinary services. In 2021, the Found Animals Registry was acquired by Pethealth Inc. (a subsidiary of Fairfax Financial). The foundation is also on the board of the Best Friends Animal Society's No-Kill Los Angeles initiative.

Michelson Institute for Intellectual Property
Dr. Michelson was a contributing author to the free 2016 textbook The Intangible Advantage: Understanding Intellectual Property in the New Economy, written for non-lawyers and undergraduate students to better understand patents, copyrights, and trademarks. In 2016, the new Michelson Institute for Intellectual Property was formed, to provide free intellectual property-related educational resources.

Michelson Medical Research Foundation 

Formed in 2005, the Michelson Medical Research Foundation aims to promote innovation in medicine and science. Its initiatives include the USC Michelson Center for Convergent Bioscience and the Institute for Protein Design at the University of Washington.

In 2017, Michelson and his wife Alya launched the Michelson Prize, to support medically relevant research by scientists under the age of 36. The 2020 Michelson Prizes were awarded to Danika Hill, research fellow at Australia's Monash University, and Michael Birnbaum, assistant professor at MIT.

Michelson Neglected Disease Initiative
In 2013, he became a principal supporter of the Sabin Vaccine Institute, giving birth to the Michelson Neglected Disease Vaccine Initiative to provide access to affordable treatments for tropical diseases.

Michelson Twenty Million Minds Foundation
In 2011, Michelson created the Twenty Million Minds Foundation (named for the number of students enrolled in higher education in the United States), to make college more affordable by underwriting a library of free online textbooks. In 2016, Michelson publicly released a variety of intellectual property tools through the organization.

The Spark Grants platform was launched by 20MM in March 2019, designed to truncate the lengthy grant-funding process. The foundation partnered with California for the first California Digital Divide Challenge in 2020, offering a $1 million prize for the best proposal to expand broadband access in the state.

Legislative

Since 2017, Michelson has funded and successfully advanced legislation for pet-related laws, in partnership with Social Compassion in Legislation. Those include:

 A bill ending the practice of pet shops sourcing animals from out of state farms, and AB 485, a companion bill requiring all pet shops in California to source their animals from local shelters and rescue groups.
 The California Cruelty-Free Cosmetic Act, banning the sale of cosmetics tested on animals.
 The Circus Cruelty Prevention Act, banning the use of animals in California circus shows.
 California Law AB 1260, which ends the practice of commercial fur trapping, and bans the sale of products made from the hides from exotic animals. The bill was designed to thwart an attempt by others to allow the sale of alligator and crocodile products in the state.
California Senate Bill 573, requiring shelters to microchip all reclaimed or adopted cats and dogs.

Personal life
Michelson lives in Los Angeles with his wife, Alya, and their three children.

In the December 2015 issue of Forbes magazine, Michelson was featured as one of "10 People with Big Ideas to Change the World".

Published works

Academic books 
 (2016) The Intangible Advantage: Understanding Intellectual Property in the New Economy (contributing author)

Selected articles 

 (2020) "America's Needed Medical Revolution" - US News & World Report 
 (2020) "Transform higher education - make textbooks free" - EdSource
 (2021) "To vaccinate our economy, boost support for the NIH" - Fortune
 (2021) "Microchipping your pets doesn't have to be expensive. Paying for registration is a scam." - USA Today
 (2022) "Accelerating the Pace of Innovation for the Greater Good" - Technology & Innovation, Vol. 22 No. 2
 (2022) "Let's help struggling students rather than benefiting textbook publishers" - EdSource (with Michelle Pilati)

Awards and honors
Inducted into the National Inventors Hall of Fame in Washington, D.C., on May 4, 2011.
 Inducted into the National Academy of Inventors on March 7, 2014.
 2015 - Albert. B Sabin Humanitarian Award, in recognition of his extraordinary philanthropy and commitment toward the control and elimination of neglected tropical diseases (NTDs).
 2015 - Distinguished Achievement Award from B'nai B'rith International, for his commitment to philanthropy, humanitarian assistance and community leadership.
 2017 - Innovation Award for Technology from the Los Angeles County Medical Association.
 2018 - Visionary of the Year Award in Philanthropy from CSQ / C-Suite Quarterly Magazine.
 2022 - Humanitarian Award Recipient, 22nd Annual Inner City Law Center Awards
2022 - IP Champion Award, Intellectual Property Owners Education Foundation

References

External links

Michelson Medical Research Foundation

1949 births
Living people
Drexel University alumni
Temple University alumni
American orthopedic surgeons
20th-century American inventors
21st-century American inventors
Jewish American inventors
People from Los Angeles
Medtronic
American billionaires
Jewish American philanthropists
Giving Pledgers
21st-century philanthropists
21st-century American Jews
Central High School (Philadelphia) alumni